Purple gromwell is a common name for several plants and may refer to:

 Lithospermum erythrorhizon, native to eastern Asia
 Lithospermum purpurocaeruleum, native to Europe and western Asia